PAF Cinema (also known as PAF Auditorium) is a cinema and movie theater based in Cantt., Lahore, Pakistan. The cinema has a capacity of 500 people to sit in the auditorium in one time all seats are sofa sittings . Cinema was launched in December 2010 in which many Pakistani celebrities participated.

References

External links 
 
 

Cinemas and movie theatres in Pakistan
2010 establishments in Pakistan
Pakistan Air Force
Auditoriums in Pakistan